Bobby Halpern (April 25, 1933 – February 8, 2015) was an American heavyweight boxer.

Early life 

Halpern's exact date of birth is unknown, but is suspected to be either April 25, 1933, May 31, 1931 or March 31, 1933. Boxrec lists Halpern's birthdate as April 25, 1933. He grew up in on Arthur Avenue in the Bronx, New York. His mother was Irish Catholic and his father was Jewish. Halpern joined a street gang and was involved in street fights and gang brawls. After being in and out of trouble, Halpern discovered a local gym and started to train to become an amateur boxer. After racking up a notable winning streak, Halpern, then 15, entered and won the 1948 New Jersey Diamond Gloves. Over the next five years, he compiled a record of 200 wins and 10 defeats. Halpern's boxing career was sidetracked by criminal activities. 

At 20, he was convicted of armed robbery and served a 4-year prison term. While serving his term, he read the autobiography of heavyweight boxer Floyd Patterson, Victory Over Myself, and decided to become a professional boxer. After being released from prison, he became a professional boxer in 1958, and won two fights to earn a match with undefeated heavyweight prospect Tom McNeeley on December 19, 1958 in New York. Halpern lost the fight by decision. At the age of 25, Halpern was convicted of robbery, assault, and kidnapping, and sentenced to 20 years to life. He was released from prison in 1975 at the age of 42, after serving 17 years. He earned the nickname, "The Hebrew Hammer" in his first comeback fight on November 10, 1976, after he knocked out 260 pound Terry Lee Kidd with one punch. However, 14 days later, Halpern was knocked out in two rounds by future World Heavyweight Champion Trevor Berbick. Halpern racked seven consecutive victories, 6 by knockout. His knockouts over Freddy McKay (KO 3) and "Diego" Joe Roberson (KO 7) were featured in Sports Illustrated.  

Outside of the ring, Halpern displayed a bad temper. He was accused of domestic violence by Antonia Maria Melendez, his girlfriend. She accused him knocking out 6 of her teeth and breaking her leg. The case against Halpern was dismissed on May 1, 1978, when Melendez failed to show up to court. Madison Square Garden (MSG) billed Halpern in their main-event on May 15, 1978 in New York City. He suffered a one punch knockout defeat in the third round. Halpern fought two exhibitions and was scheduled for a 10 round fight against Dave Dittmore in June. 

While shopping for clothes at a Bronx store, two men, one armed with a shotgun and the other with a .38 caliber, approached Halpern and opened fire, the former striking him 11 times, and the latter 3 times. Halpern was hospitalized with a severe wound to his hand. The hand injury would end Halpern's career. A few months later, Halpern's ex-girlfriend, Melendez, pleaded guilty to charges related to the attack. He later advertised auto parts in New York and worked as a cornerman. He was arrested on a number of occasions for such charges as conspiring to murder, and weapons charges. Halpern's last public appearance was in May 2008. A boxing reunion at Ring 8 in New York City reunited Halpern with his former ring rival Guy "The Rock" Casale. The feature screenplay, "The Third Round", written by Ben Fiore and Bobby's ring rival, Guy 'The Rock' Casale, features segments of Bobby's life and career and centers upon their fight at MSG in 1978.

Halpern out-lived his siblings and died on February 8, 2015.

Professional boxing record

References

Sources

www.Jewsinsports.org. 
The End of An Era for New York Boxing, May 12, 2005, by Mitch Abramson. 
Spitbucket News, June 14, 2003: YOUTH BOXING TAKES CENTER STAGE IN THE BRONX. 
Jewish Sports Review, September/October 2001, Volume 3, Number 1, issue 25. 
The New York Times, October 21, 1992: BUT THE FIGHTER STILL REMAINS IN BELMONT; AFTER 59 YEARS OF TAKING IT ON THE CHIN, BOBBY HALPERN CAN STILL THROW A PUNCH, by Ivan Fisher. 
The New York Times, June 24, 1983:SPORTS PEOPLE; EX-BOXER INDICTED. 
The New York Times, August 15, 1982: SPORTS PEOPLE; COMING AND GOINGS. 
The New York Times, January 26, 1980, page 24: BOBBY HALPERN ACQUITTED OF ARSON, by Josh Barbanel. 
The New York Times, January 17, 1979: HALPERN, THE BOXER, HELD WITH 2 ON CHARGE OF SETTING BRONX FIRE, by Robert McFadden. 
The New York Times, May 26, 1978, Sports Section, page B3: HALPERN SHOT A WEEK AFTER HIS BOXING COMEBACK. 
The New York Times, May 12, 1978, Sports Section, page A21: HALPERN, FORMER CONVICT, SPARS FOR RIKER INMATES, by Thomas Rogers. 
Sports Illustrated, December 5, 1977: MAKING A COMEBACK FROM NOWHERE, by Paul Zimmerman. 
The Chronicle Herald, November 20, 1976, TREVOR BERBICK "OUTCLASSED" BOBBY HALPERN, by Lorna Inness. 
The New York Times, November 18, 1958: FLAMIO OUTPOINTS LYNCH AT ST. NICKS.

Heavyweight boxers
Southpaw boxers
Jewish boxers
Jewish American boxers
1930s births
Boxers from New York City
2015 deaths
American male boxers
American people convicted of robbery
American people convicted of kidnapping
American sportspeople convicted of crimes